The Ministry of Education of the People's Republic of China is a cabinet-level department under the State Council responsible for basic education, vocational education, higher education, and other educational affairs across the country. The Ministry of Education also acts as a funder for most of the national public universities and colleges in China. The ministry also accredits tertiary institutions, curriculum, and school teachers. It is headquartered in Xicheng, Beijing.

History 
The Ministry of Education was one of the first Government Administration Council departments created when the People's Republic of China was founded in October 1949. The work of the ministry was overseen by the Culture and Education Commission that was created at the same time. On October 19, writer and poet Guo Moruo was made the director of the commission, and linguist Ma Xulun was made the first education minister of the People's Republic of China.

The Ministry of Education was established in 1949 as the Ministry of Education of the Central People's Government, and was renamed the State Education Commission of the People's Republic of China from 1985 to 1998.  Its current title was assigned during the restructuring of the State Council in 1998.

List of Education Ministers

See also

Education in China
List of universities and colleges in Beijing
List of universities in China
English Medium Medical Schools
Ministries of the People's Republic of China
Guozijian

References

External links 
 

Education
China
Education in China
China, Education